RANS Nusantara Football Club  (formerly known as Cilegon United and RANS Cilegon FC) is an Indonesian football club and currently based in Bogor, West Java. RANS Nusantara FC's nickname is Magenta Force and The Prestige Phoenix. The club currently plays in Liga 1, the top division of Indonesian football.

History
The club was established in 2012 and does not have much history in Indonesian football. Previously, they were named Cilegon United. On 31 March 2021, the club were acquired by RANS Entertainment and Prestige Motorcars. They were renamed RANS Cilegon F.C. RANS is a company owned by Raffi Ahmad and Nagita Slavina, while Prestige is a supercar dealer from North Jakarta.

On 28 September 2021, RANS Cilegon made their Liga 2 debut in a 3–1 loss to Dewa United at the Gelora Bung Karno Madya Stadium. A week later, they had their second match in a 2–1 win against Persekat Tegal. On 1 December 2021, they closed the match in the group stage of the 2021–22 Liga 2 in a 3–0 win against PSKC Cimahi and with this result, they qualified for the second round as runners-up of Group B. On 22 December 2021, they qualified for the semi-finals of the 2021–22 Liga 2 as Group X winners after a 0–0 draw over Sriwijaya. Satisfactory results occurred in the semi-final match five days later, when they qualified for the final and won promotion to Liga 1 next season after a 3–0 win over PSIM Yogyakarta. but in the final match on 30 December 2021, they suffered a 2–1 defeat to Persis Solo and eventually became the league's runners-up.

On 30 May 2022, during the 2022 PSSI Ordinary Congress, the club changed their name to RANS Nusantara FC. This was part of club chairman Raffi's desire to have his club be supported by fans from all corners of Indonesia.

Coaching staff

Players

Current squad

Naturalized players

Out on loan

Coaches

Honours 
Liga 2
 Runner-up: 2021
Liga Indonesia First Division
 Champions: 2014
Liga Indonesia Second Division
 Champions: 2013

Supporters
Supporters of RANS Nusantara FC are called Ultras RANS (UltRANS).

Mascot 
RANS' mascot is a magenta-coloured phoenix, which also appears on the club's crest.

References

External links 

RANS Nusantara F.C.
Bogor
Football clubs in West Java
Football clubs in Indonesia
Association football clubs established in 2012
2012 establishments in Indonesia